Sebkha-El-Coursia is a salt pan, locality and archaeological site in Tunisia. It was an ancient Roman Catholic diocese.

History
During antiquity the city was a civitas of the Roman province of Africa Proconsularis called Giufi Salaria.

During the Byzantine and Roman Empires, Sebkha-El-Coursia was also the seat of an ancient Christian episcopal see, suffragan to the Archdiocese of Carthage. Only two bishops of Giufi Salaria are known.  Procolo a catholic attended the Council of Carthage (411), and Bennato who participated in the anti-monothetalism Council of Carthage (646). 

Today Giufi Salaria survives as titular bishopric and  the current bishop is Herman Willebrordus Woorts, of Utrecht.

References

Coloniae (Roman)
Ancient Berber cities
Catholic titular sees in Africa
Roman towns and cities in Tunisia
Archaeological sites in Tunisia
Populated places in Tunisia